Lord Armstrong may refer to:
 Iain Armstrong, Lord Armstrong, Senator of the College of Justice in Scotland
 Robert Armstrong, Baron Armstrong of Ilminster (1927–2020), British former civil servant
 William Armstrong, Baron Armstrong of Sanderstead (1915–1980), British civil servant and banker
 One of the hereditary Barons Armstrong:
William Armstrong, 1st Baron Armstrong (1810–1900)
 William Watson-Armstrong, 1st Baron Armstrong (1863–1941)
 William Watson-Armstrong, 2nd Baron Armstrong (1892–1972)
William Watson-Armstrong, 3rd Baron Armstrong (1919–1987)

See also 
 Baron Armstrong